Keelakorukkai is a village in the Kumbakonam taluk of Thanjavur district, Tamil Nadu, India.

Demographics 

As per the 2001 census, Keelakorukkai had a total population of 1262 with 605 males and 657 females. The sex ratio was 1069. The literacy rate was 87.92

References 

 

Villages in Thanjavur district